Djadochtatheriidae is a family of fossil mammals within the extinct order Multituberculata. Remains are known from the Upper Cretaceous of Central Asia. These animals lived during the Mesozoic, also known as the "age of the dinosaurs". This family is part of the suborder of Cimolodonta. The taxon Djadochtatheriidae was named by Z. Kielan-Jaworowska and J. H. Hurum in 1997.

Multituberculates are a rather diverse group in terms of locomotion and diet. Forms like Kryptobaatar and Catopsbaatar were hopping, gerboa-like omnivores (and this is probably the ancestral condition for the group, given that Nemegtbaatar also had this lifestyle), while Mangasbaatar was a robust, digging herbivore.

References

 Kielan-Jaworowska Z. and Hurum J. H. (1997), Djadochtatheria: a new suborder of multituberculate mammals. Acta Palaeontologica Polonica 42(2), p. 201–242.
 Kielan-Jaworowska Z. and Hurum J. H. (2001), Phylogeny and Systematics of multituberculate mammals. Paleontology 44, p. 389–429.
 Much of this information has been derived from Mesozoic Mammals Djadochtatherioidea, an Internet directory.

Cimolodonts
Late Cretaceous first appearances
Late Cretaceous extinctions
Prehistoric mammal families